Thomas Walter Edwards Jr. (November 11, 1929 – March 31, 2015) was an American politician in the state of South Carolina. He served in the South Carolina House of Representatives as a member of the Democratic Party from 1967 to 1988, representing Spartanburg County, South Carolina. He attended the University of Denver, and was a businessman, owning a real estate/investment firm, as well as a farmer. He died in 2015.

References

1929 births
2015 deaths
Democratic Party members of the South Carolina House of Representatives
Politicians from Knoxville, Tennessee
People from Spartanburg, South Carolina
Businesspeople from South Carolina
Farmers from South Carolina
University of Denver alumni
20th-century American businesspeople